Tilopa (Prakrit; Sanskrit: Talika or Tilopadā; 988–1069) was an Indian Buddhist monk in the tantric Kagyu lineage of Tibetan Buddhism.

He lived along the Ganges River, with wild ladies as a tantric practitioner and mahasiddha. He practiced Anuttarayoga Tantra, a set of spiritual practices intended to accelerate the process of attaining Buddhahood. He became a holder of all the tantric lineages, possibly the only person in his day to do so. As well as the way of insight, and Mahamudra he learned and passed on the Way of Methods, today known as the 6 Yogas of Naropa, and guru yoga. Naropa is considered his main student.

Life
Tilopa was born into the priestly caste. He adopted the monastic life upon receiving orders from a dakini (female buddha whose activity is to inspire practitioners) who told him to adopt a mendicant and itinerant existence. From the beginning, she made it clear to Tilopa that his real parents were not the persons who had raised him, but instead were primordial wisdom and universal voidness. Advised by the dakini, Tilopa gradually took up a monk's life, taking the monastic vows and becoming an erudite scholar. The frequent visits of his dakini teacher continued to guide his spiritual path and close the gap to enlightenment.

He was born in either Chativavo (Chittagong) or Jagora in Bengal, India.

He began to travel throughout India, receiving teachings from many gurus:

 from Saryapa he learned of inner heat (Sanskrit: caṇḍalī, Tib. tummo, inner heat);
 from Nagarjuna he received the radiant light (Sanskrit:  prabashvara) and illusory body (Sanskrit:  maya deha, Tib. gyulu) teachings (Cakrasaṃvara Tantra), Lagusamvara tantra, or Heruka Abhidharma;
 from Lawapa, the dream yoga;
 from Sukhasiddhi, the teachings on life, death, and the bardo (between life states, and consciousness transference) (phowa);
 from Indrabhuti, he learned of wisdom (prajña);
 and from Matangi, the resurrection of the dead body.

As advised by Matangi, Tilopa started to work at a brothel in Bengal for a prostitute called Dharima as her solicitor and bouncer. During the day, he was grinding sesame seeds for his living. During a meditation, he received a vision of Vajradhara and, according to legend, the entirety of mahamudra was directly transmitted to Tilopa. After receiving the transmission, Tilopa meditated in two caves, and bound himself with heavy chains to hold the correct meditation posture. He practiced for many years and then met the mind of all buddhas in the form of Diamond Holder Vajradhara. He is considered the grandfather of today's Kagyu Lineage. Naropa, his most important student, became his successor and carried and passed on the teachings.

At Pashupatinath Temple premise, greatest Hindu  shrine of Nepal, there are two caves where Tilopa attained Siddhi and initiated his disciple Naropa.

Teachings

Six Precepts or Words of Advice
Tilopa gave Naropa a teaching called the Six Words of Advice, the original Sanskrit or Bengali of which is not extant; the text has reached us in Tibetan translation. In Tibetan, the teaching is called gnad kyi gzer drug – literally, "six nails of key points" – the aptness of which title becomes clear if one considers the meaning of the English idiomatic expression, "to hit the nail on the head."

According to Ken McLeod, the text contains exactly six words; the two English translations given in the following table are both attributed to him.

Watts-Wayman translation

An earlier translation circa 1957 by Alan Watts and Dr. Alex Wayman rendered Tilopa's "Six Precepts" as
No thought, no reflection, no analysis,
No cultivation, no intention;
Let it settle itself.

In a footnote, Watts cited a Tibetan source text at partial variance with McLeod's in sequence and syntax, namely:
Mi-mno, mi-bsam, mi-dpyad-ching,
Mi-bsgom, mi-sems, rang-babs-bzhag.

Based on an "elucidation" provided by Wayman, Watts explained that
Mi-mno is approximately equivalent to the Zen terms wu-hsin (無心) or wu-nien (無念), "no-mind" or "no thought." Bsam is the equivalent of the Sanskrit cintana, i.e., discursive thinking about what has been heard, and dpyad of mimamsa, or "philosophical analysis." Bsgom is probably bhavana or the Chinese hsiu (修), "to cultivate," "to practice," or "intense concentration." Sems is cetana or szu (思), with the sense of intention or volition. Rang-babs-bzhag is literally "self-settle-establish," and "self-settle" would seem to be an almost exact equivalent of the Taoist tzu-jan (自然, pinyin: zì rán), "self-so", "spontaneous", or "natural".

Watts had studied Chinese, and Wayman was a Tibetologist and professor of Sanskrit associated with UCLA and later Columbia University.

Mahamudra instructions
Tilopa also gave mahamudra instruction to Naropa by means of the song known as "The Ganges Mahamudra," one stanza of which reads:

The fool in his ignorance, disdaining Mahamudra,
Knows nothing but struggle in the flood of samsara.
Have compassion for those who suffer constant anxiety!
Sick of unrelenting pain and desiring release, adhere to a master,
For when his blessing touches your heart, the mind is liberated.

Attachment and enjoyment
One of the most famous and important statements attributed to Tilopa is: "The problem is not enjoyment; the problem is attachment."

See also
 Erdne Ombadykow, as Telo Tulku Rinpoche, supposed reincarnation of Tilopa
 History of Tibet

References

Bibliography

External links
 An English translation of "The Ganges Mahamudra"
 Several English translations of "The Ganges Mahamudra"

10th-century Buddhists
11th-century Buddhists
Bodhisattvas
Indian scholars of Buddhism
History of Tibet
Kagyu lamas
Mahasiddhas
988 births
1069 deaths
Indian Buddhist monks
Buddhist yogis
10th-century Indian monks
11th-century Indian monks
History of Tibetan Buddhism